Weatherall or Weatherill is a surname, and may refer to:

Weatherall
 Andrew Weatherall (1963–2020), English musician, DJ, songwriter, producer and remixer
 Ann Weatherall (born 1964), New Zealand psychologist
 David Weatherall (1933–2018), British physician and researcher
 James Weatherall (1936–2018), Royal Navy admiral
 Jim Weatherall (1929–1992), American football player
 Kimberlee Weatherall (born 1974), Australian intellectual property lawyer
 Maddison Weatherall (born 2001), New Zealand rugby player
 Miles Weatherall (1920–2007), British pharmacologist
 Percy Weatherall (born 1957), British businessman

Weatherill
 Bernard Weatherill (1920–2007), British Conservative politician, Speaker of the House of Commons between 1983–1992
 Bob Weatherill (1897–1992), Australian football player
 George Weatherill (politician) (1936–2021), Australian politician, deputy leader of the South Australian Labor Party
 George Weatherill (footballer) (1900–1986), Australian football player
 Jay Weatherill (born 1964), Australian politician, Premier of South Australia 2011–2018

See also
 Wetheral, Cumbria, England
 Wetherall